The Circuito Costanera  (commonly known as the Costanera Circuit), was a Grand Prix circuit in Buenos Aires (Argentina). Two variants are known to have existed under Circuito "Avenida" Costanera and Costanera "Sur" which are listed by a few data sources as circuits used for the 1930, 1932 and 1936 Buenos Aires races.  Verifiable records can only confirm the Costanera Norte circuit layouts for the 1951 V Gran Premio General Perón (Feb. 18), V Gran Premio Eva Perón (Feb. 25), Gran Premio Eva Perón (Ciudad) Sport (March 18) and the 1957 1000 km de Buenos Aires.

Buenos Aires Grand Prix 1948 - 1950

1000 km Buenos Aires

Lap Records  
The fastest official race lap records at the Circuito Costanera (Buenos Aires) are listed as:

References